Enonkosken Pyrintö is a volleyball club from Enonkoski, Finland. The men's team of Pyrintö is playing in the second highest tier of Finnish volleyball, Southern group of 1-sarja. Team's coach is Bulgarian Todor Marinov.

Pyrintö was founded in 1919. Formerly it was a multi-sports club. The most famous and successful athlete of the club is runner Antti Loikkanen.

Current squad
Mika Nenonen
Petri Siitonen
Jussi Lautiainen
Antti Pölönen
Mika Kettunen
Eetu Pennanen
Kalle Heikkinen
Juuso Paananen
Teemu Saarinen
Markus Tammaru

In Sprint 2010 Saimaa Volley players Kirill Borichev and Markus Väisänen play also for EnPy.

External links
 Official homepage

Finnish volleyball clubs